The Fenner Medal, named after the  Australian virologist Frank Fenner, is awarded each year by The Australian Academy of Science  for distinguished research in biology (excluding the biomedical sciences) by a scientist up to 10 years post-PhD in the calendar year of nomination.

The award is restricted to Australian residents or for biologists whose research was conducted mainly in Australia.

Recipients
Source: Fenner Medal Awardees Australian Academy of Science

See also
 List of academic awards

References

Biology awards
Australian Academy of Science Awards
Awards established in 2000